Whiteland may refer to one of several places:

United States
Whiteland, Indiana
 Whiteland Community High School
New Whiteland, Indiana
East Whiteland Township, Pennsylvania
West Whiteland Township, Pennsylvania
 West Whiteland Inn, in West Whiteland Township

Trinidad and Tobago
Whiteland, Trinidad and Tobago

See also 
The Three Princesses of Whiteland, fairy tale
Eugène Terre'Blanche
 Whitelands College, one of the four constituent colleges of the University of Roehampton, London, England